Strumyk may refer to the following places in Poland:
 Strumyk, Gmina Góra
 Strumyk, Gmina Kramsk